Diogo Pereira Moniz (born 24 January 1993) is a Portuguese football player who plays for Praiense.

Club career
He made his professional debut in the Segunda Liga for Santa Clara on 3 March 2013 in a game against Vitória Guimarães B.

References

External links
 

1993 births
People from São Miguel Island
Living people
Portuguese footballers
C.D. Santa Clara players
Liga Portugal 2 players
S.C. Praiense players
Association football midfielders
Association football defenders